Achim Walcher (born 1 December 1967) is an Austrian cross-country skier. He competed at the 1998 Winter Olympics and the 2002 Winter Olympics. He was disqualified from the 2002 Winter Olympics for using blood doping.

Cross-country skiing results
All results are sourced from the International Ski Federation (FIS).

Olympic Games

World Championships

World Cup

Season standings

Team podiums

 1 victory 
 7 podiums

References

1967 births
Living people
Austrian male cross-country skiers
Olympic cross-country skiers of Austria
Cross-country skiers at the 1998 Winter Olympics
Cross-country skiers at the 2002 Winter Olympics
People from Liezen District
Austrian sportspeople in doping cases
Doping cases in cross-country skiing
Sportspeople from Styria